Jérôme Haehnel and Julien Jeanpierre were the defending champions, but they did not compete in the Junior's this year.
Jürgen Melzer and Kristian Pless won in the final 6–7, 6–3, 6–0, against Ladislav Chramosta and Michal Navrátil.

Seeds

Draw

Finals

Top half

Bottom half

External links
Main Draw

Boys' Doubles
1999